Vatke is the surname of:
 Georg Carl Wilhelm Vatke (1849–1889), German botanist to whom the botanical abbreviation Vatke refers.
 (Johann Karl) Wilhelm Vatke (1806–1882), German theologian.